USS Cimarron (AO-22) was a  oiler serving with the United States Navy and the second ship to be named for the Cimarron River in the Southwestern United States. She was launched 7 January 1939 by Sun Shipbuilding and Drydock Company, Chester, Pennsylvania; sponsored by Mrs. William D. Leahy; and commissioned 20 March 1939.

World War II 
Cimarron cleared Houston on 31 May 1939 for Pearl Harbor, arriving on 21 July. She transported oil between west coast ports and Pearl Harbor, making 13 such voyages until she sailed for the east coast on 19 August 1940. After repairs and alterations, she began oil runs on the east coast, principally between Baton Rouge and Norfolk, until August 1941, when she took part in amphibious operations. From 5–16 September she put to sea with a transport convoy bound for Iceland, and voyaged north again from 12 October to 5 November to refuel ships at Placentia Bay. On 15 November 1941, she joined a convoy at Trinidad bound for Singapore with reinforcements, but was detached from the convoy on 9 December at Cape Town, South Africa. Returning to Trinidad on 31 December, she operated from Brazilian ports to Iceland until 4 March 1942, when she cleared Norfolk for San Francisco.

Pacific War
Cimarron reached San Francisco on 1 April 1942 and sailed the next day with the task force bound for the first air raid on Tokyo on 18 April. With , they fueled the fleet at sea before and after the raid, and returned to Pearl Harbor on 25 April. She sailed on 29 April, bound to join the force soon to join battle with the Japanese naval forces in the Coral Sea, but arrived after the battle to refuel destroyers at Nouméa, and returned to Pearl Harbor on 26 May. She cleared Pearl Harbor on 28 May to fuel the force which defeated the Japanese in the Battle of Midway and returned on 12 June, departing on 7 July to support the operation in the Solomon Islands. Using Nouméa as her principal base, Cimarron occasionally reloaded at Suva and Efate. After repairs at San Francisco in November 1942, she sailed for the forward area 18 December. She operated again out of Nouméa supporting the final stages of the Guadalcanal action, then fueled out of Efate, carried cargo to Sydney, Australia, and returned to fueling at Dumbea Bay in support of the occupation of New Georgia. She returned to San Francisco, in July 1943, and then made two trips from the west coast to Pearl Harbor.

Cimarron departed Pearl Harbor 29 September 1943 with the force which raided Wake Island on 5–6 October, and returned to Pearl Harbor on 16 October. She sailed once again on 14 November to fuel in support of the Gilbert Islands campaign, returning 1 December, and sailed to San Pedro, California, to reload 12 December to 4 January 1944. Clearing Pearl Harbor on 13 January 1944, she supported the Marshall Islands operation and the February attacks on Truk from Majuro until 6 June; the Marianas operation from Eniwetok until 26 August; and the Palau Islands operation from Ulithi.

After a stateside overhaul from October through December 1944, Cimarron arrived at Ulithi on 26 December 1944. From 27 December to 21 January 1945 she sailed to fuel the task force launching air attacks on Indo-China and Philippine targets as part of the Luzon invasion, and put to sea again from 8 February to 22 March for air raids on the Japanese home islands and the invasion of Iwo Jima. From 26 March to 23 May she sailed from Ulithi to fuel ships engaging in the Okinawa operation, and from 3 June shuttled between Ulithi and the areas from which the mighty carrier task forces launched the final series of raids upon the heartland of Japan. Ulithi remained her base as she supported the occupation until 10 September, when she anchored in Tokyo Bay. Operations in the Far East continued until 4 February 1946, when she arrived at Long Beach Naval Shipyard, for overhaul.

Korean War 
Between July 1946 and June 1950, Cimarron ferried oil from the Persian Gulf to naval bases in the Marianas and Marshalls, occasionally continuing on to the US West Coast. Her first tour of duty in the Korean war, from 6 July 1950 to 3 June 1951, found her fueling ships of the Taiwan Patrol at Okinawa, amphibious ships at Kobe, and operating from Sasebo to the waters off Korea to fuel task forces. Several times she entered the heavily mined waters of Wonsan Harbor South Korea to fuel the ships carrying out the lengthy blockade and bombardment of that key port.

Returning to the west coast, she gave service as a training tanker until her second Korean tour, from 1 August to 10 December 1951. During this time she spent a month at Taiwan fueling the ships on duty in the Formosa Straits, and made three voyages to Korean waters from Sasebo. During 1952, overhaul and training on the west coast preceded her third Korean war deployment from 9 April to 5 January 1953, when her duty was similar to that of her second. Her fourth tour of duty in the Far East was completed between 11 April and 27 November 1953.

Cimarron sailed to the Far East again between 14 June 1954 and 8 February 1955, during which she served as flagship of the United Nations support group for Operation Passage to Freedom, the evacuation of refugees from Communist North Vietnam. Her pattern of operations from that time into 1963 included highly effective support of the guardian U.S. 7th Fleet in its Far Eastern operations through deployments in 1955, 1956-1957, 1957-1958, 1958-1959, 1959, and 1960. As of 1963, she had the longest continuous commissioned service of any active ship in the United States Navy, belying her age as she continued to provide her essential support with outstanding skill and efficiency.

Vietnam War 

Cimarron continued her service into the Vietnam War between 1965 and 1967 and received the Armed Forces Expeditionary Medal and Vietnam Service Medal for its participation in the Vietnam Advisory Campaign, Vietnam Defense, and Vietnamese Counteroffensive Phases I through III. In 1968, she was the oldest US Navy ship in continuous active service. Cimarron was decommissioned and struck from the Navy List in October 1968 and sold for scrap in 1969.

The bell from the ship was installed at Cimarron High School in Cimarron, New Mexico, where it was donated because of its proximity to Cimarron River Basin's headwaters and in recognition of this ship's dedicated crew members.

Awards
Cimarron received 10 battle stars for World War II service, 7 for the Korean War, and 4 campaign stars for her Vietnam War service.

See also
1936 Merchant Marine Act  and MARCOM
Naval Control And Protection of Shipping (NCAPS)
Naval War College Simulations - 1936-38 War Plan Orange
W. W. Behrens, Jr. - US Naval Academy Midshipman, who may have influenced fleet oiler naming protocol with CNO William D. Leahy, whose wife sponsored Cimarron.
Cimarron Basin Watershed Reducing Elevation Awareness Deficiency (EAD) by adding self-defense gunnery weapons that also enabled independent steaming between fortified fuel storage facilities and more forward fleet operating areas.
  for other ships having same first CO.

References

External links

T3-S2-A1 Type Tankers
Biography of Cimarron's first CO
Korean War Project Connections
Vice Admiral David C. Richardson (former Cimarron CO)	

 

Cimarron-class oilers (1939)
1939 ships
Ships built by the Sun Shipbuilding & Drydock Company
World War II auxiliary ships of the United States
World War II tankers of the United States
Cold War auxiliary ships of the United States
Korean War auxiliary ships of the United States
Vietnam War auxiliary ships of the United States